American singer-songwriter Phil Ochs (December 19, 1940, – April 9, 1976,) wrote or recorded at least 238 songs during his brief career. Most of the songs which he performed he composed himself: they ranged in style from protest songs and topical songs to ballads and folk rock. In concert, Ochs sometimes covered songs made famous by other performers. On one occasion, during the height of Beatlemania in 1964, he and Eric Andersen performed The Beatles' "I Should Have Known Better" at a hootenanny, something Ochs described as "very much out of character with this whole program". In the early part of 1970, Ochs surprised his fans by donning a gold lamé suit (commissioned from Elvis Presley's tailor) and going on tour with a rock band; during the brief concert tour, he sang his own material along with medleys of songs by Buddy Holly, Elvis, and Merle Haggard.

Ochs never had a hit single, but one of his records broke into the charts. "Outside of a Small Circle of Friends" reached No. 20 in Los Angeles and was No. 119 on Billboards national "Hot Prospect" listing. Joan Baez had a hit in the U.K. with her cover of "There but for Fortune", a song written by Ochs. (In the U.S. it peaked at No. 50 on the Billboard charts—a good showing, but not a hit.)

Ochs' songs, "Bwatue" and "Niko Mchumba Ngombe", which he co-wrote with two African musicians named Dijiba and Bukasa. were written and recorded in Kenya in 1973, and are early examples of blending Western popular music with world music. Critics note that they predate Paul Simon's Graceland album by more than ten years. The lyrics to "Bwatue" are in Lingala, and the lyrics to "Niko Mchumba Ngombe" are in Swahili. The songs were released as a single in Africa, and most Ochs fans never heard of them until they were included on a compilation album in 1997.

This is a list of all songs recorded by Ochs that have been officially released. (Camp Favorites, an album of traditional children's songs that was released anonymously, has not been included.) In the case of studio recordings released during his lifetime, the album title and date of album release have been included. For posthumous releases and demo recordings, the approximate date of recording is shown as well. In the case of live recordings, the date of recording and album on which the track appears have been included. Some recordings have been re-released on compilation albums; their reissue has not been noted.

Except where indicated, all songs were written by Ochs.

A

B

C

D

E

F

G

H

I

J

K

L

M

N

O

P

R

S

T

U

W

See also
Phil Ochs discography

References

Footnotes

Works cited

Further reading

External links
 Phil Ochs Discography by Sonny Ochs, includes lists of Phil Ochs songs and covers

Ochs, Phil